Moulton College was a private girls' school in Toronto, Canada which was part of  McMaster University. The school was located in the former home of Senator William McMaster and Susan Moulton McMaster on Bloor Street East. The school was affiliated with the Baptist Convention of Ontario and Quebec.

In 1954, McMaster University closed the school.

References

External links
 Drawing of Moulton College, 1939, by Nicholas Hornyansky
 Photo of Moulton College, 1955, by James V. Salmon
 Description from website: "Features footage of Moulton College Preparatory School (Toronto, on 88 Bloor St E between Yonge and Park Rd.). Includes interior and exterior shots of students' living areas, working, etc. Also includes Kingsway School, a nursery and junior school that was at 85 Old Mill Rd., in the Kingsway neighbourhood of Toronto."

 
 

 

Private schools in Toronto
McMaster University